The 2011 Trading Post Perth Challenge was a motor race for the Australian sedan-based V8 Supercars racing cars. The Trading Post Perth Challenge was the fourth event of the 2011 International V8 Supercars Championship. It was the 34th time a motor racing event held at Barbagallo Raceway had contributed to the Australian Touring Car Championship and its successors. It was held on the weekend of April 29 to May 1 at Barbagallo Raceway, near Wanneroo, just outside Perth, Western Australia.

The event hosted races 7, 8 and 9 of the 2011 season in a unique to this event format. Each race was held of 50 laps of the 2.4 kilometre venue, making for race distances of 120 kilometres for each race. An alternative pointscore was used, giving 100 points for each race instead of the usual 150 points, meaning that the extra race would not make the Perth Challenge worth any more than the standard two race event. In keeping with the concept introduced in 2010 that each race is a standalone event, a different qualifying procedure was established. The usual Saturday Top Ten Shootout was abandoned and the grid for the two Sunday races was established by a single qualifying session with each driver's second fastest lap used to establish the grid for Sunday's Race 9.

The meeting was overshadowed by a heavy collision at the start of Race 8 which saw Steve Owen collide with the stalled Holden Commodore of Karl Reindler. The impact ruptured the fuel tank at the rear of Reindler's Brad Jones Racing Commodore, causing the car to erupt into a fireball. Reindler received only minor burns and Owen only minor injuries. It was doubly unfortunate for Reindler after he had finished seventh the previous race, a career best performance.

Jamie Whincup collected the most championship points for the weekend, 292 out of the possible 300, after winning races 7 and 9 and finished second in race 8. Jason Bright was next best performed with 260 points which included second in race 9, and victory in race 8. The race win was additionally notable as it was the first championship race win recorded by a Brad Jones Racing driver, recorded after joining V8 Supercar in 2000. Whincup's team mate Craig Lowndes was third for the weekend having collected 252 points over the three races, including a second in Race 7, making for a 1–2 finish in the race for the Triple Eight Race Engineering team. The best performed Ford driver of the weekend was Stone Brothers Racing lead driver, Shane van Gisbergen, who scored 196 points. The best individual performance by a Ford driver was by Will Davison of Ford Performance Racing with a third-place finish in Race 7, the only Ford podium result for the weekend.

Results
Results as follows:

Qualifying Race 7
Qualifying timesheet:

Race 7
Race timesheets:

Qualifying Race 8
Qualifying timesheet:

Standings
 After 9 of 28 races.

References

Perth V8 400
Perth V8 400
Sport in Perth, Western Australia
Motorsport in Western Australia